Southern Railway Freight Station is a historic railway station located at Morganton, North Carolina. Built-in 1929, it is listed on the National Register of Historic Places.

History 
In 1929, the one-story 4,750-sq.ft Southern Railway Freight Station was completed. It is the third freight station for Morganton, located to the east of the passenger depot, on the north side of the railroad track. The station catered textile and furniture industries located in the Piedmont Triad.

After the development of highways and private automobiles throughout the 20th-century, the use of the freight station diminished. Till 1970, the Freight Station's building was in use as a warehouse for Morganton Hardware. And by 1994, it was in used as a furniture warehouse.

References 

Historic districts on the National Register of Historic Places in North Carolina
Colonial Revival architecture in North Carolina
Historic districts in Burke County, North Carolina
National Register of Historic Places in Burke County, North Carolina